Masengo Ilunga is a retired footballer who played as a midfielder for club sides in Zaire, Greece and Cyprus.

Club career
Ilunga began playing football with TP Mazembe.

Ilunga moved to Greece in July 1982, joining Greek first division side Ethnikos Piraeus F.C. He would make 151 league appearances during his six seasons with the club.

International career
Ilunga made several appearances for the Zaire national football team, including six 1982 FIFA World Cup qualifying matches. He was on the Zairian squad at the 1976 African Cup of Nations and appeared in two matches.

References

External links

Living people
Democratic Republic of the Congo footballers
Democratic Republic of the Congo expatriate footballers
Democratic Republic of the Congo international footballers
1976 African Cup of Nations players
Expatriate footballers in Greece
Expatriate footballers in Cyprus
Democratic Republic of the Congo expatriate sportspeople in Greece
Democratic Republic of the Congo expatriate sportspeople in Cyprus
Ethnikos Piraeus F.C. players
TP Mazembe players
Enosis Neon Paralimni FC players
Super League Greece players
Association football midfielders
Year of birth missing (living people)
21st-century Democratic Republic of the Congo people